Jeff Lynne is an English rock musician who founded the Electric Light Orchestra and has performed with and produced other artists, including George Harrison, Bob Dylan, Tom Petty and Roy Orbison. He has collaborated on various projects with former members of the Beatles.

Beatles influence
The Beatles were a major influence on Lynne since the release of Please Please Me. In 1968, while performing with The Idle Race, he and the other members of the band were invited to a Beatles session at Abbey Road. While there, he met the Beatles during the making of The White Album, witnessing the band making it together. He spent an hour at the session, before going back to the sessions with the Idle Race. Years later, he admitted that being in the same room "caused me not to sleep for, like, three days." The original aim of Electric Light Orchestra was to take up "where the Beatles had left off, and to present it on stage." Although this was actually stated by Roy Wood rather than Lynne. John Lennon praised the group, calling them the "sons of the Beatles" on a radio station when discussing the group's 1973 single "Showdown" on the New York radio station WNEW.

Critics often compared Electric Light Orchestra to The Beatles, and they were often criticised for "ripping off" the band. Lynne admitted that he "was very influenced by the Beatles' sound of '68 and '69. That has obviously been a big influence on the way [he] looked at songwriting" and said that being compared with The Beatles was the "ultimate compliment".

With George Harrison
Lynne worked with George Harrison very closely in the late 1980s. Lynne met Harrison through a mutual friend; Dave Edmunds. After having dinner with Lynne, Edmunds told Lynne that Harrison wanted to meet him. When Lynne and Harrison met, they started having a lot of fun with each other; the two began writing songs together and took a vacation to Australia. This friendship eventually led to Harrison's appearance at the Birmingham Heartbeat Charity Concert, showing up as the finale of the concert and joining many other musicians in a rendition of "Johnny B. Goode", as well as a one-off Electric Light Orchestra concert, both in 1986. That year, he remixed a previously released song of Harrison's, "That's The Way It Goes". He also co-produced two new Harrison songs, "Zig Zag" and "The Hottest Gong In Town", which would respectively be released in 1988 and 1992. In 1987, he appeared with Harrison at Prince's Trust in Wembley Arena, and co-produced Cloud Nine, Harrison's first album since 1982's Gone Troppo, which turned out to be a massive success. 

Before the release of "This Is Love", the third and final single from Harrison's highly acclaimed album, the record company asked for a B-side for the song. Deciding he needed help, Harrison gathered some of his musician friends, eventually resulting in the formation of the Traveling Wilburys. Lynne was a member of the supergroup along with Harrison, Bob Dylan, Tom Petty and Roy Orbison. Harrison and Lynne contributed to the writing of all Wilburys tracks including "Handle with Care", "Wilbury Twist" and "End of the Line". In 1989 Lynne produced "Cheer Down", a song Harrison contributed to the soundtrack to Lethal Weapon 2 and released as a single to promote the film.

Harrison began work on Brainwashed in 1988, with "Any Road" having been written by Harrison during the making of a video for "This Is Love" off the Cloud Nine album, and would continue to do so in a sporadic manner over the next decade and a half. After recuperating from a knife attack that occurred in his home on 30 December 1999, Harrison focused more on getting his album finished, simultaneously sharing his ideas for all its details (from the sound of the finished songs to the album's artwork) with his son Dhani, information that would ultimately prove very valuable. After Harrison's death in late 2001, Lynne and Dhani completed production. PopMatters called the album "a rich musical treasure trove well mined in execution and production". Rave reviews were also given by Allmusic—"Brainwashed isn't just a success, it's one of the finest records Harrison ever made." In late 2002 Lynne took part in a special tribute, Concert for George, performing "The Inner Light", "I Want to Tell You", "Give Me Love (Give Me Peace on Earth)" and collaborating with Petty and the Heartbreakers on "Handle with Care". Lynne also produced the live album of the concert, released in 2003, which included performances by both Paul McCartney and Ringo Starr.

When Harrison was inducted into the Rock and Roll Hall of Fame, Lynne joined Petty in performances of "Handle With Care" and "While My Guitar Gently Weeps".

With Ringo Starr
In 1990, Ringo Starr recorded a cover version of The Beatles' "I Call Your Name" for a television special marking the 10th anniversary of John Lennon's death and the 50th anniversary of his birth. The track, produced by Lynne, features a supergroup composed of Lynne, Petty, Joe Walsh and Jim Keltner.

In 1992, Lynne produced two tracks of Starr's come-back album Time Takes Time. A third track produced by Lynne appeared as a bonus track on CD single and on the Japanese issue of the album.

With the Beatles
In 1994, the three surviving Beatles approached Lynne to help them produce new Beatles material from poorly preserved mono tapes containing some unfinished Lennon demos that Yoko Ono had given them. The resulting songs were "Free as a Bird" and "Real Love". McCartney admitted having some reservation about having Lynne as producer. McCartney said, "He's such a pal of George's. They'd done the Wilburys, and I was expecting him to lead it that way. To tell you the truth, I thought that he and George might create a wedge, saying, 'We're doing it this way' and I'd be pushed out." He later acknowledged his reservations proved unfounded, as Lynne conducted the sessions in an evenhanded manner. "Free as a Bird" later won a Grammy.

With Paul McCartney
Lynne co-produced eight tracks on Paul McCartney's 1997 album Flaming Pie, plus the B-side "Looking for You". Upon its release, Flaming Pie was received with critical and commercial acclaim, with McCartney achieving his best reviews since Tug of War. With fresh credibility even with young fans who had been introduced to him through the Anthology project, and anticipation raised with the excellent reviews, Flaming Pie debuted at No. 2 in the UK and US, giving McCartney his first US Top 10 album since 1982. In both countries, the album was the biggest entry in its initial week. In 2000, McCartney recorded a cover version of "Maybe Baby" for the 2000 film of the same name with Lynne once again acting as producer.

References

English rock musicians
Jeff Lynne
Living people
The Beatles
Year of birth missing (living people)